Kusolwan Sorut (born 1 January 1941) is a Thai sprinter. She competed in the women's 100 metres at the 1964 Summer Olympics.

References

External links
 

1941 births
Living people
Athletes (track and field) at the 1964 Summer Olympics
Kusolwan Sorut
Kusolwan Sorut
Place of birth missing (living people)
Olympic female sprinters
Kusolwan Sorut
Kusolwan Sorut